is a passenger railway station on the Seibu Ikebukuro Line located in the city of Nishitōkyō, Tokyo, Japan, operated by the private railway operator Seibu Railway.

Lines

Station layout

The station has one island platform and one side platform serving a total of three tracks. The side platform serves trains going up on track 3. The island platform serves trains going down on platform 1 and some trains either go up or down on platform 2.

A siding exists between the running tracks west of the station for use by trains terminating at Hōya. Stabling tracks also exist north of the line to the west of the station.

Platforms

History

The station opened on April 15, 1915.

Station numbering was introduced on all Seibu Railway lines during fiscal 2012, with Hōya Station becoming "SI12".

Passenger statistics
In fiscal 2019, the station was the 14th busiest on the Seibu network with an average of 63,372 passengers daily.   The passenger figures for previous years are as shown below.

See also
 List of railway stations in Japan

References

External links

  

Railway stations in Japan opened in 1915
Seibu Ikebukuro Line
Railway stations in Tokyo
Stations of Seibu Railway
Nishitōkyō, Tokyo